Sayad Shirazi Hospital is a public hospital located in Gorgan, Iran and currently has a capacity of 300 beds.

References

External links 
Location of Sayad Shirazi Hospital

hospitals in Iran